The Global 500 Roll of Honour was an award given from 1987 to 2003 by the United Nations Environment Programme (UNEP). The award recognized the environmental achievements of individuals and organizations around the world. A successor system of UNEP awards called Champions of the Earth started in 2005.

Awardees

Since the inception of the award in 1987, over 719 individuals and organizations, in both the adult and youth categories, have been honoured with the Global 500 award. Among prominent winners are:
 Anil Agarwal, prominent environmentalist from India.
 Sir David Attenborough, producer of environmental television programmes.
 Idelisa Bonnelly, 1987 Dominican Republic marine biologist who created the first Humpback Whale Sanctuary.
 Gro Harlem Brundtland, former Prime Minister of Norway.
 Jimmy Carter, former President of the United States. He later won the Nobel Peace prize.
 Jacques-Yves Cousteau, French marine explorer.
 Jane Goodall of the United Kingdom whose research on wild chimpanzees and olive baboons provided insight into the lives of non-human primates
 Annelisa Kilbourn, British conservationist, veterinarian and wildlife expert.
 Gabriel Lewis-Charles, the prominent environmentalist from St Lucia.
 Wangari Maathai, founder of the Green Belt Movement, a Kenyan grassroots environmental organisation. She later won the Nobel Peace prize.
 Harada Masazumi, Japanese medical researcher heavily involved in the study of Minamata disease.
 Francisco "Chico" Mendes, the Brazilian rubber tapper who was murdered during his fight to save the Amazon rainforest.
 George Monbiot, British journalist and researcher.
 Stephen O. Andersen, prominent US environmentalist, for efforts on stratospheric ozone protection
 Nikita Moiseyev, prominent Russian scientist, leading expert on consequences of nuclear war – "nuclear winter".
 Ken Saro-Wiwa, the environmental and human rights activist from Nigeria who was executed for leading the resistance of the Ogoni People against the pollution of their Delta homeland.
Andrew Simmons, environmental activist and educator.
Severn Suzuki, environmental activist.
Lily Venizelos, Greek conservationist, founder and president of the Mediterranean Association to Save the Sea Turtles (MEDASSET).

See also 
Environmental Media Awards
Global Environmental Citizen Award
Goldman Environmental Prize
Grantham Prize for Excellence in Reporting on the Environment
Heroes of the Environment
Tyler Prize for Environmental Achievement
 List of environmental awards

References

External links
Website of the Global 500 Laureate Roll of Honour 

Awards established in 1987
Environmental awards
United Nations Environment Programme